El Cerro Mission is a census-designated place (CDP) in Valencia County, New Mexico, United States. The population was 4,657 at the 2010 census. It is part of the Albuquerque Metropolitan Statistical Area.

The U.S. Census Bureau previously considered El Cerro Mission and the neighboring community of Monterey Park to be a single CDP, El Cerro-Monterey Park. The CDP was split prior to the 2010 Census.

Geography

Demographics

As of the 2010 census, there were 4,657 people, 1,406 households, and 1,101 families residing in the CDP. The population density was 791.9 people per square mile (305.9/km). There were 1,556 housing units at an average density of 264.6 per square mile (102.2/km). The racial makeup of the CDP was 59.7% White, 0.8% African American, 3.6% Native American, 0.8% Asian, 0.0% Pacific Islander, 30.9% from other races, and 4.3% from two or more races. Hispanic or Latino of any race were 72.5% of the population.

There were 1,406 households, out of which 51.3% had children under the age of 18 living with them, 55.8% were married couples living together, 12.8% had a female householder with no husband present, and 21.7% were non-families. 15.7% of all households were made up of individuals, and 2.8% had someone living alone who was 65 years of age or older. The average household size was 3.31 and the average family size was 3.71.

Education
The community's public schools are operated by Los Lunas Schools.

References

Census-designated places in New Mexico
Census-designated places in Valencia County, New Mexico
Albuquerque metropolitan area